SMS Uszok was one of four s built for the  (Austro-Hungarian Navy) during the First World War. Completed in 1918, she participated an unsuccessful raid on the Otranto Barrage later that year. She was transferred to Italy in 1920 in accordance with the peace treaties ending the war and renamed Monfalcone. The  (Royal Italian Navy) kept her in service until 1939 and the ship was subsequently scrapped.

Background and description
The loss of two s in the 1st Battle of Durazzo in 1915 caused the Austro-Hungarian Navy to begin construction of four improved versions of the Tátras the following year.

The ships had a complement of 114 officers and enlisted men.

The destroyers were powered by two AEG-Curtiss steam turbine sets, each driving a single propeller shaft using steam provided by six Yarrow boilers. Four of the boilers were oil-fired while the remaining pair used coal, although oil was sprayed onto the coal to increase power.

The main armament of the Ersatz Triglav-class destroyers consisted of two Škoda Works  K11 guns, one each fore and aft of the superstructure in single mounts. Their secondary armament consisted of four  K09 TAG ( (anti-torpedo boat guns)). Two additional guns were placed on anti-aircraft mountings. They were also equipped with four  torpedo tubes in two twin rotating mountings aft of the funnels. Two spare torpedoes were stored on the main deck.

Construction and service
The four Ersatz Triglav-class destroyers were ordered on 19 January 1916. Uzsok was laid down at the Porto Re (now Kraljevica in Croatia) shipyard of Ganz-Danubius on 25 September 1916. The ship was launched on 16 September 1917 and completed on 25 January 1918.

End of the war 
By October 1917 it had become clear that Austria-Hungary was facing defeat in the war. With various attempts to quell nationalist sentiments failing, Emperor Karl I decided to sever Austria-Hungary's alliance with Germany and appeal to the Allies in an attempt to preserve the empire from complete collapse. On 26 October Austria-Hungary informed Germany that their alliance was over. At the same time, the Austro-Hungarian Navy was in the process of tearing itself apart along ethnic and nationalist lines. Vice Admiral Miklós Horthy was informed on the morning of 28 October that an armistice was imminent, and used this news to maintain order and prevent a mutiny among the fleet. While a mutiny was spared, tensions remained high and morale was at an all-time low.

The following day the National Council in Zagreb announced Croatia's dynastic ties to Hungary had come to an end. This new provisional government, while throwing off Hungarian rule, had not yet declared independence from Austria-Hungary. Thus Emperor Karl I's government in Vienna asked the newly formed State of Slovenes, Croats and Serbs for help maintaining the fleet stationed at Pola and keeping order among the navy. The National Council refused to assist unless the Austro-Hungarian Navy was first placed under its command. Emperor Karl I, still attempting to save the Empire from collapse, agreed to the transfer, provided that the other "nations" which made up Austria-Hungary would be able to claim their fair share of the value of the fleet at a later time. All sailors not of Slovene, Croatian, Bosnian, or Serbian background were placed on leave for the time being, while the officers were given the choice of joining the new navy or retiring.

The Austro-Hungarian government thus decided to hand over the bulk of its fleet, preferring to do that rather than give the fleet to the Allies, as the new state had declared its neutrality. Furthermore, the newly formed state had also not yet publicly dethroned Emperor Karl I, keeping the possibility of reforming the Empire into a triple monarchy alive.

Post-war 
On 3 November the Austro-Hungarian government signed the Armistice of Villa Giusti with Italy, ending the fighting along the Italian Front, although it refused to recognize the transfer of Austria-Hungary's warships. As a result, on 4 November, Italian ships sailed into the ports of Trieste, Pola, and Fiume and Italian troops occupied the naval installations at Pola the following day. The National Council did not order any men to resist the Italians, but they also condemned Italy's actions as illegitimate. On 9 November, all remaining ships in Pola harbour had the Italian flag raised. At a conference at Corfu, the Allies agreed the transfer could not be accepted, despite sympathy from the United Kingdom. Faced with the prospect of being given an ultimatum to surrender the former Austro-Hungarian warships, the National Council agreed to hand over the ships beginning on 10 November. When the Allies divided up the Austro-Hungarian Fleet amongst its members in January 1920, Uszok was awarded to Italy. She was commissioned in the Regia Marina with the name Monfalcone in September and was discarded and subsequently scrapped on 5 January 1939.

Notes

Citations

Bibliography 
 

 

 
 

Ersatz Triglav-class destroyers
1917 ships